The 2019–20 AEK B.C. season is AEK's 63rd season in the top-tier level Greek Basket League. AEK is competing in three different competitions during the season.

Transfers 2019–20

Players in 

|}

Players out 

|}

Friendlies

Competitions

Overall

Overview

Greek League

League table

Results summary

Results by round

Regular season

Results overview

Greek Cup

 Quarterfinals

 Semifinals

 Final

FIBA Champions League

Regular season - Group B

Results summary

Results by round

Regular season

Results overview

Round of 16

Final eight

References

AEK B.C. seasons
2019–20 in European basketball by club